Davian Clarke (born 30 April 1976) is a Jamaican former athlete, who mainly competed in the 400 metres. He won the bronze medal in the 4 x 400 metres relay at the 1996 Olympics, and many relay medals followed, before he won his first individual medal at the 2004 IAAF World Indoor Championships. Davian Clarke is also a graduate of University of Miami Patti & Allan Herbert Business School with Bachelor of Business Administration (BBA).

Achievements

Personal bests 
 200 metres – 20.72 s (1999)
 400 metres – 44.83 s (2004)

References

External links
 
 Bio at U. Miami Sports Hall of Fame

1976 births
Living people
Jamaican male sprinters
Athletes (track and field) at the 1996 Summer Olympics
Athletes (track and field) at the 2000 Summer Olympics
Athletes (track and field) at the 2004 Summer Olympics
Athletes (track and field) at the 1998 Commonwealth Games
Athletes (track and field) at the 2002 Commonwealth Games
Athletes (track and field) at the 2006 Commonwealth Games
Athletes (track and field) at the 1999 Pan American Games
Athletes (track and field) at the 2003 Pan American Games
Olympic bronze medalists for Jamaica
Olympic athletes of Jamaica
Place of birth missing (living people)
Commonwealth Games medallists in athletics
World Athletics Championships medalists
Olympic bronze medalists in athletics (track and field)
Commonwealth Games gold medallists for Jamaica
Commonwealth Games bronze medallists for Jamaica
Pan American Games medalists in athletics (track and field)
Pan American Games gold medalists for Jamaica
Goodwill Games medalists in athletics
World Athletics Indoor Championships winners
World Athletics Indoor Championships medalists
Medalists at the 1996 Summer Olympics
Competitors at the 1998 Goodwill Games
Medalists at the 1999 Pan American Games
Medalists at the 2003 Pan American Games
Central American and Caribbean Games medalists in athletics
Central American and Caribbean Games silver medalists for Jamaica
Competitors at the 1998 Central American and Caribbean Games
20th-century Jamaican people
21st-century Jamaican people
Medallists at the 1998 Commonwealth Games
Medallists at the 2006 Commonwealth Games